Hocking County is a county located in the U.S. state of Ohio. As of the 2020 census, the population was 28,050. Its county seat is Logan. The county was organized on March 1, 1818, from land given by Athens, Fairfield, and Ross counties. Its name is from the Hocking River, the origins of which are disputed but is said to be a Delaware Indian word meaning "bottle river". Hocking County is included in the Columbus, OH Metropolitan Statistical Area.

Geography

Waterways
The major waterway of Hocking County is the Hocking River, which flows roughly from WNW to ESE, arising in Fairfield County and flowing from Hocking County into Athens County. This river drains about half the county.  To the southwest, much of the rest of the county is drained by Salt Creek, which flows from there into Vinton County. A small part of the southeastern county is drained by Raccoon Creek, which also flows into Vinton County. The easternmost area of the county is within the Monday Creek watershed.  A small area in the north of the county is drained by Rush Creek.

Adjacent counties
 Perry County (northeast)
 Athens County (southeast)
 Vinton County (south)
 Ross County (southwest)
 Pickaway County (west)
 Fairfield County (northwest)

National protected area
 Wayne National Forest (part)

Demographics

2000 census
As of the census of 2000, there were 28,241 people, 10,843 households, and 7,828 families living in the county. The racial makeup of the county was 97.32% White, 0.92% Black or African American, 0.28% Native American, 0.08% Asian, 0.08% from other races, and 1.09% from two or more races. 0.68% of the population were Hispanic or Latino of any race.

There were 10,843 households, out of which 33.50% had children under the age of 18 living with them, 58.30% were married couples living together, 9.50% had a female householder with no husband present, and 27.80% were non-families. 23.70% of all households were made up of individuals, and 10.00% had someone living alone who was 65 years of age or older. The average household size was 2.54 and the average family size was 2.98.

In the county, the population was spread out, with 25.50% under the age of 18, 8.10% from 18 to 24, 28.30% from 25 to 44, 25.00% from 45 to 64, and 13.10% who were 65 years of age or older. The median age was 38 years. For every 100 females there were 99.30 males. For every 100 females age 18 and over, there were 97.90 males.

The median income for a household in the county was $34,261, and the median income for a family was $40,888. Males had a median income of $31,951 versus $24,123 for females. The per capita income for the county was $16,095. About 10.30% of families and 13.50% of the population were below the poverty line, including 15.80% of those under age 18 and 14.50% of those age 65 or over.

2010 census
As of the 2010 United States Census, there were 29,380 people, 11,369 households, and 7,948 families living in the county. The racial makeup of the county was 97.5% white, 0.7% black or African American, 0.3% American Indian, 0.2% Asian, 0.2% from other races, and 1.1% from two or more races. Those of Hispanic or Latino origin made up 0.7% of the population. In terms of ancestry, 25.3% were German, 15.0% were American, 14.1% were Irish, and 9.0% were English.

Of the 11,369 households, 32.3% had children under the age of 18 living with them, 53.9% were married couples living together, 10.7% had a female householder with no husband present, 30.1% were non-families, and 24.8% of all households were made up of individuals. The average household size was 2.52 and the average family size was 2.98. The median age was 40.9 years.

The median income for a household in the county was $39,586 and the median income for a family was $48,796. Males had a median income of $39,219 versus $30,371 for females. The per capita income for the county was $19,048. About 12.3% of families and 15.3% of the population were below the poverty line, including 20.7% of those under age 18 and 10.8% of those age 65 or over.

Politics
Hocking County has been considered to be a swing county in presidential elections as most were won by close margins. Barack Obama came within 105 votes in 2008 and 128 in 2012; Bill Clinton was the last Democrat to win it, in 1996.

|}

Government

The county commissioners are Sandra Ogle, Gary Waugh, and Jeff Dickerson, and the Hocking County Sheriff is Lanny North.

Communities

City
 Logan (county seat)

Villages
 Buchtel
 Laurelville
 Murray City

Townships

 Benton
 Falls
 Good Hope
 Green
 Laurel
 Marion
 Perry
 Salt Creek
 Starr
 Ward
 Washington

Census-designated places
 Carbon Hill
 Haydenville
 Hide-A-Way Hills
 Rockbridge
 West Logan

Unincorporated communities
 Ewing
 Ilesboro
 Sand Run
 South Bloomingville
 Union Furnace

See also
 National Register of Historic Places listings in Hocking County, Ohio

References

External links

 Hocking County government's website

 
Appalachian Ohio
Counties of Appalachia
1818 establishments in Ohio
Populated places established in 1818